Fraser High School could refer to:

Hamilton's Fraser High School in New Zealand
Fraser High School in Fraser, Michigan, United States